|

Tyree Talton (born May 10, 1976) is a former American football defensive back in the National Football League (NFL) and the XFL. He played for the NFL's Detroit Lions in 1999. In 2001, he played for the New York/New Jersey Hitmen. He played at the collegiate level at the University of Northern Iowa. He was drafted in the 8th round and 58th overall in the 2001 XFL Draft by the New York/New Jersey Hitmen.

References

1976 births
Living people
Sportspeople from Beloit, Wisconsin
Players of American football from Wisconsin
American football safeties
Northern Iowa Panthers football players
Detroit Lions players
New York/New Jersey Hitmen players